Intact Financial Corporation is a Canadian multinational property and casualty insurance company. Originally established in 1809 as the Halifax Fire Insurance Association, it was later acquired by Nationale-Nederlanden and from 1993 to 2009 was a subsidiary of the Dutch multinational ING Group under the name ING Canada. Intact Financial directly underwrites insurance through its subsidiary companies Intact Insurance and Belair Insurance (operating as Belairdirect), as well as operating additional brokerage, insurance service, and damage restoration subsidiaries. , Intact was the largest provider of property and casualty insurance in Canada by annual premiums.

The company has over 16,000 employees and insures more than five million individuals and businesses through its insurance subsidiaries. In the J.D. Power 2015 Canadian Home Insurance Satisfaction Study, belairdirect was ranked highest in the Atlantic/Ontario region with a score of 799 and in the Quebec region with a score of 814 and Intact Insurance ranked third with a score of 791.

History

The company was founded as the Halifax Fire Insurance Association in 1809. In the 1950s, Dutch insurer Nationale-Nederlanden (NN) established itself in Canada by acquiring the Halifax Insurance Company; Dutch immigration to Canada attracted Nationale-Nederlanden to the country.

In the 1980s, the company continued to grow with the acquisition of three well-known regional insurers - Commerce Group and Belair in Quebec, and Western Union in Alberta. In 1991, Nationale-Nederlanden merged with NMB Postbank to create ING Group, one of the first bank assurance groups in the world. In 1993, as the company's business continued to grow, it brought together its insurance companies that had been operating as separated entities under the umbrella of ING Canada.

A more cohesive entity, ING Canada made a series of acquisitions: the Guardian Insurance business in 1998, followed by the acquisition of Zurich Canada home, auto and small and medium business insurance portfolio in 2001.

In 2004, the company acquired Allianz Canada. That was soon followed with an initial public offering and the start of trading on the Toronto Stock Exchange with ING Group retaining 70% ownership.

On March 10, 2009, ING Insurance Company of Canada changed its name to Intact Insurance Company. On May 13, 2009, ING Canada Inc. changed its name to Intact Insurance.

The company came together through a series of major acquisitions starting in 2011 when Intact acquired Axa Canada for $2.6 billion.  The next year Intact acquired Jevco Insurance Company for $530 million, which allowed the company to expand its service to brokers through the opportunity to offer their clients complementary specialized products such as recreational vehicle insurance and specialty lines products to businesses.

In 2014, Intact acquired Metro General Insurance Corporation which operated largely in Newfoundland and Labrador.  In 2015, it acquired Canadian Direct Insurance Incorporated (CDI), extending its direct-to-consumer operations from coast to coast.

In May 2017, Intact announced an all-cash deal to acquire OneBeacon Insurance Group, Ltd., an American specialty insurer for US$1.7 billion ($2.3 billion). The deal closed in September 2017.

In July 2018, Intact announced they would be investing $3 million in the autonomous vehicle company startup company Voyage. Intact would be insuring self-driving vehicles in The Villages, Florida, one of the largest retirement communities using real-time pricing of insurance that take into account environmental factors.

On August 6, 2019, Intact announced the acquisition of Canadian property restoration company On Side Developments Ltd., the parent company of On Side Restoration. Nine days later, Intact announced the acquisition of North American specialty insurer, The Guarantee Company of North America and Frank Cowan Company Limited (now Intact Public Entities Inc.), a specialty insurance managing general agent.

In October 2020, Intact rebranded its U.S. operations as Intact Insurance Specialty Solutions (formerly operating as OneBeacon Insurance Group and The Guarantee Company of North America).

In November 2020, Intact and Danish insurer Tryg A/S announced a joint offer to acquire RSA Insurance Group. This would represent an approximately £7.2 billion transaction with Intact paying £3.0 billion and Tryg paying £4.2 billion. Intact would retain RSA's Canada and UK & International operations and obligations, Tryg would retain RSA's Sweden and Norway operations, and Intact and Tryg would co-own RSA's Denmark operations. In January 2021, the Canadian Competition Bureau and shareholders of RSA have approved the acquisition. The transaction closed on June 1, 2021.

In May 2022, Intact and Tryg A/S announced the sale of their subsidiary, Codan Forsikring A/S’s Danish business - Codan Denmark to Alm. Brand A/S Group.

References

External links
 

Companies listed on the Toronto Stock Exchange
Insurance companies of Canada
Financial services companies established in 1809
Companies based in Toronto
Property insurance companies
1809 establishments in the British Empire